Vertigo pygmaea, common name the "crested vertigo",  is a species of minute air-breathing land snail, a terrestrial pulmonate gastropod mollusk in the family Vertiginidae, the whorl snails.

Shell description

The shell is extremely small, oval-cylindric and obtuse at the summit, of a more or less deep brown, smooth and dull. The spire consists of five whorls.

The aperture is scarcely longer than wide, and nearly round, furnished with four teeth, of which the superior is acute, two deeply placed inferior, and finally one on the columellar margin. A fifth tooth is often found in the base of the aperture. The lateral margin is slightly angular in the middle. Peristome is reflected below. The umbilical crevice quite pronounced.

This snail lives under hedges.

(description as Vertigo heldi) The shell is rimate, turreted, irregularly and very finely striate, of reddish-brown color, glossy. The shell has 6 whorls, that are slowly increasing and rather convex. The first 3 whorls form a blunt summit which is about ⅓ the length of the shell. The last 3 whorls are of nearly equal height and form the remaining cylindric part of the shell. The last whorl is neither calloused nor contracted preceding the aperture.

The aperture is about ¼ the length of shell, arcuately convex, somewhat impressed on the outer side, the impression running as a groove-like depression for a short distance on the last whorl. Aperture is toothed, the teeth are reddish, very weak and placed deep in the throat: 1 tooth on the middle of the parietal wall, 1 on the columella, 2 very weakly developed, frequently wanting, on the palatal wall. Peristome is continuous, somewhat expanded, little thickened.

The width of the adult shell is 1.1-1.25 mm, the height is 2.4-2.7 mm.

Distribution

This species occurs in Europe in the following countries and islands:
 Czech Republic
 Netherlands
 Poland
 Slovakia
 Ukraine
 Great Britain
 Ireland
 Latvia
 and others

And in America, in various places including:
 Michigan - special concern, see List of threatened fauna of Michigan

References
This article incorporates public domain text from reference.
 Clessin S. 1877. Eine neue Pupa. Nachrichtsblatt der Deutschen Malakozoologischen Gesellschaft 9 (4-5): 49-51. Frankfurt am Main.

 Sterki, V. (1890). On new forms of Vertigo. Proceedings of the Academy of Natural Sciences of Philadelphia. 42: 31-35.
 Provoost, S.; Bonte, D. (Ed.) (2004). Animated dunes: a view of biodiversity at the Flemish coast [Levende duinen: een overzicht van de biodiversiteit aan de Vlaamse kust]. Mededelingen van het Instituut voor Natuurbehoud, 22. Instituut voor Natuurbehoud: Brussel, Belgium. ISBN 90-403-0205-7. 416, ill.
 Sysoev, A. V. & Schileyko, A. A. (2009). Land snails and slugs of Russia and adjacent countries. Sofia/Moskva (Pensoft). 312 pp., 142 plates.

External links
Vertigo pygmaea at Animalbase taxonomy, short description, distribution, biology, status (threats), images
images representing Vertigo pygmaea at  Encyclopedia of Life
winter survival
 Draparnaud, J. P. R. (1801). Tableau des mollusques terrestres et fluviatiles de la France. Montpellier / Paris (Renaud / Bossange, Masson & Besson). 1-116
 Gray, J. E. (1821). A natural arrangement of Mollusca, according to their internal structure. London Medical Repository. 15 (87): 229–239
 Pilsbry, H. A. (1899). New American land shells. The Nautilus. 12(9): 101-104
 Clessin, S. (1877). Eine neue Pupa. Nachrichtsblatt der deutschen malakozoologischen Gesellschaft. 9(4/5): 49-51
 Dall, W. H. (1904). Notes on the nomenclature of the Pupacea and associated forms. The Nautilus. 17(10): 114-116
 Schileyko, A. A. & Rymzhanov, T. S. (2013). Fauna of land mollusks (Gastropoda, Pulmonata Terrestria) of Kazakhstan and adjacent territories. Moscow-Almaty: KMK Scientific Press. 389 pp

pygmaea
Gastropods described in 1801